Wiesenburg (official name: Wiesenburg/Mark) is a municipality in the Potsdam-Mittelmark district, in Brandenburg, Germany. It is situated 10 km west of Bad Belzig, and 34 km southwest of Brandenburg. It is located in the High Fläming Nature Park.

Geography
Since 2000, when 14 surrounding villages voluntarily merged to form the free municipality Wiesenburg/Mark, it has had an area of 218.19 km².

These villages became districts (Ortsteile) of Wiesenburg/Mark:
Benken
Grubo
Jeserig/Fläming
Jeserigerhütten
Kelpzig
Lehnsdorf
Medewitz
Mützdorf
Neuehütten
Reetz
Reetzerhütten
Reppinichen
Schlamau
Wiesenburg

Demography

Politics

The mayor of Wiesenburg/Mark is Marco Beckendorf of the Left Party (Die Linke). He was elected by the municipal council in 2014.

The municipal council currently has 16 members, of whom four belong to the Social Democrats (SPD), two each to the Left Party (Die Linke) and the Christian Democrats (CDU), and one each to The Greens and theFree Democrats (FDP). The remaining six councillors represent small local groups.

Places of interest
The main attractions are the Wiesenburg Castle, a medieval castle that has been partially transformed into a neo-renaissance palace, and its park. Wiesenburg Castle is open to the public on selected days and for the Annual Christmas Market. 

There is also a set of sculpture walks starting from Wiesenburg and heading towards Bad Belzig.

References

External links

 Private Website 
 Wiesenburg Castle 
 Wiesenburg Park 
 High Fläming Nature Park 
 Bahnhof am Park/Wiesenburg

Fläming Heath
Localities in Potsdam-Mittelmark